German–Dutch relations are diplomatic, military and cultural ties between the bordering nations of Germany and the Netherlands. Relations between the modern states started after Germany became united in 1871.  Before that the Netherlands had relations with Prussia and other, smaller German-speaking nations.

History
In the 15th century, Mary of Burgundy,  titular Duchess of Burgundy, reigned over the Burgundian State before she married with Archduke Maximilian of Austria, the future Holy Roman Emperor Maximilian I in 1477.  The Seventeen Provinces arose from the Burgundian Netherlands, a number of fiefs held by the House of Valois-Burgundy and inherited by the Habsburg dynasty in 1482. Starting in 1512, the Provinces formed the major part of the Burgundian Circle. When Emperor Charles V, who secularized Prince-Bishopric of Utrecht, began the gradual abdication of his several crowns in October 1555, his son Philip II took over as overlord of the conglomerate of duchies, counties and other feudal fiefs known as the Habsburg Netherlands.

In 1566, the Dutch Revolt and the ensuing Eighty Years War have started, and a number of incidents and frictions had accumulated between the Dutch provinces and their Habsburg overlord. In 1648, the Seven United Provinces became independent and seceded to form the Dutch Republic by the Peace of Westphalia. The Dutch Golden Age continued in peacetime during the Dutch government worked as well with german people like Philipp Franz von Siebold and Caspar Schamberger, who stayed Dutch colonial state Dutch East Indies or Duch trading post in Japan, or the Governor Peter Minuit in the New Netherland.

From the mid-17th century, the costly conflicts, including the Anglo-Dutch Wars, Franco-Dutch War and War of the Spanish Succession fuelled economic decline and after the French period in the Netherlands as known as the Batavian Republic and the Kingdom of Holland, the Netherlands became independent again in 1813. 

During World War I, the Imperial German army refrained from attacking the Netherlands, and thus relations between the two states were preserved. At war's end in 1918, the former Kaiser Wilhelm II fled to the Netherlands, where he lived until his death in 1941. The German army occupied the Netherlands during World War II and kept the country under occupation in 1940–1945. Adolf Hitler had considered the Netherlands suitable for annexation within the Greater Germanic Reich, viewing the Dutch as a related Germanic people. During this period, nearly three-quarters of the Dutch Jewish population was murdered in the Holocaust. Anne Frank was the most famous victim, as her diary survived and was published after the war. The Dutch famine of 1944–45, known in the Netherlands as the Hongerwinter (literal translation: hunger winter), was a famine that took place in the German-occupied Netherlands, especially in the densely populated western provinces north of the great rivers, during the winter of 1944–45, near the end of World War II. A German blockade cut off food and fuel shipments from farm towns. Some 4.5 million were affected and survived thanks to soup kitchens. At least 18–22,000 deaths occurred due to the famine. The famine was alleviated by the liberation of the provinces by the Allies in May 1945.

The Netherlands launched Operation Black Tulip in 1946 and annexed some German territories. The Netherlands and the Federal Republic of Germany officially remained in a state of war with each other until 26 July 1951.

Present
Germany has an embassy in The Hague and consuls in Amsterdam, Arnhem, Eindhoven, Enschede, Groningen, Leeuwarden, Maastricht, Noord-Beveland, Rotterdam, while the Netherlands has an embassy in Berlin and consuls in Düsseldorf, Frankfurt, Hamburg, Munich and Stuttgart. Both nations are members of the European Union and NATO.

According to the official website of the Dutch government, relations between the two are currently "excellent", enjoying "close political, economic, social, cultural, administrative and personal ties". Germany is also by far the Netherlands’ main trading partner, both in imports and exports.

Emigration
, around 164,000 people with a Dutch migration background resided in Germany. Around 77,000 Germans resided in the Netherlands.

Country comparison

Embassies 
The Embassy of Germany is located in The Hague, the Netherlands. The Embassy of the Netherlands is located in Berlin, Germany.

See also
Germany–Netherlands border
Germany–Netherlands football rivalry
Germans in the Netherlands
Dutch people in Germany

References

Further reading
 Jensen, Mette Bastholm. Solidarity in action: A comparative analysis of collective rescue efforts in Nazi-occupied Denmark and the Netherlands (Yale University Press, 2007).
 Kennedy, John R. "Dutch defensive preparations, 1933-1940" (DTIC, Army Command and General Staff College, Fort Leavenworth Ks, 1989) online.
 Leurdijk, J.H. ed. The Foreign Policy of the Netherlands (Alphen aan den Rijn, 1978).
 Maass, Walter B. The Netherlands at War: 1940-1945 (London: Abelard-Schuman, 1970),
 Mason, Henry L. "War Comes to the Netherlands: September 1939-May 1940." Political Science Quarterly 78.4 (1963): 548–580. Online
 
 Moore, R. Refugees from Nazi Germany in the Netherlands 1933–1940 (Springer, 2012).
 Moore, Bob. "Jewish Refugees in the Netherlands 1933–1940: The Structure and Pattern of Immigration from Nazi Germany." Leo Baeck Institute Yearbook 29.1 (1984): 73-101.
  Pearson, Frederic S. Weak State in International Crisis: The Case of the Netherlands in the German Invasion Crisis of 1939-40 (1981). 
 Steinberg, Jonathan. "A German Plan for the Invasion of Holland and Belgium, 1897." Historical Journal 6.1 (1963): 107–119. Online
 Tammes, Peter. "Jewish immigrants in the Netherlands during the Nazi occupation." Journal of Interdisciplinary History 37.4 (2007): 543–562. online
 Tuyll van Serooskerken, Hubert P. van. Netherlands & World War I: Espionage, Diplomacy & Survival (2001) 381p. 
 Vandenbosch, Anry.  Dutch Foreign Policy Since 1815 (Hyperion Press, 1959) online free to borrow
 Van Der Zee, Henri A., ed. The Hunger Winter: Occupied Holland, 1944-1945 (U of Nebraska Press, 1998).
 Van Kleffens, Eelco Nicolaas. Juggernaut over Holland : the Dutch foreign minister's personal story of the invasion of the Netherlands (Columbia University Press, 1942)
 Warmbrunn, Werner  The Dutch Under German Occupation, 1940-1945 (Stanford University Press, 1963)

External links
 "Ups and downs between Germany and the Netherlands" (Deutsche Welle DW)

 
Netherlands
Bilateral relations of the Netherlands